Nripa Kama II (r. 1026–1047 CE) was an early king of the Hoysala Empire from the Malnad region of Karnataka and was possibly a vassal of the Western Ganga Dynasty and fought many wars against the Cholas. Thought unable to rout the Cholas from southern regions of present-day Karnataka, he successfully ruled some regions in the Malnad area.

Citations

Sources
 Suryanath U. Kamath (1980), A Concise history of Karnataka from pre-historic times to the present, Jupiter books, MCC, Bangalore, 1980 (Reprinted 2001, 2002) OCLC: 7796041

1047 deaths
Hoysala kings
Hindu monarchs
11th-century Indian monarchs